The 1909 Villanova Wildcats football team represented the Villanova University during the 1909 college football season. Led by sixth-year head coach Fred Crolius, Villanova compiled a record of 3–2. The team's captain was Joseph Curley.

Schedule

References

Villanova
Villanova Wildcats football seasons
Villanova Wildcats football